Washu can refer to: 
    
 WashU, an abbreviation for Washington University in St. Louis 
 Washū, another name for Yamato Province, Japan 
 Washu Hakubi, a fictional character the manga series Tenchi Muyo!